Amanda D. Lotz is an American educator, television scholar, and media scholar based in Australia since 2019. She is known for her research in television studies, digital disruption, the economics of television and media companies, and also popularizing the terms network era, post-network era, and the multi-channel transition describing the television industry's transition to cable and to internet distribution.

Lotz is Professor at Queensland University of Technology and program leader of the Transforming Media Industries research program in QUT's Digital Media Research Centre. Prior to joining QUT, she was a Professor of Communication Studies at the University of Michigan, an assistant professor at Denison University and a Mellon Postdoctoral Fellow at Washington University in St. Louis.

Her areas of research are media industries, the economics of the television/cable industry, broadband distributed media, television studies, and gender and the media.

She holds a B.A. in communication from DePauw University, an M.A. in Telecommunication from Indiana University, and a Ph.D. in Radio, Television and Film from University of Texas.

Lotz co-hosted the Media Business Matters Podcast, which focuses on recent stories in media and why they matter from 2016 to 2018. She was a Fellow at the Peabody Media Center.

Publications
Lotz has authored, co-authored or edited eleven books in addition to many refereed journal articles, book chapters, and conference presentations.

Lotz is the author of: 
Netflix and Streaming Video: The Business of Subscriber-funded Video on Demand (Polity, 2022)
Media Disrupted: Surviving Pirates, Cannibals and Streaming Wars (MIT Press, 2021).
We Now Disrupt This Broadcast: How Cable Transformed Television and the Internet Revolutionized It All (MIT Press, 2018).
Portals: A Treatise on Internet-Distributed Television (Ann Arbor: University of Michigan Library, 2017). Open access version
Cable Guys: Television and American Masculinities in the 21st Century (New York University Press, 2014)
The Television Will Be Revolutionized (New York University Press, 2007) A revised, second edition was published in 2014.  
Redesigning Women: Television After the Network Era (University of Illinois Press, 2006)

Lotz is the co-author of: 
Media Industry Studies(with Daniel Herbert and Aswin Punathambekar, Polity, 2020)
Understanding Media Industries (with Timothy Havens, Oxford University Press, 2011). A revised, second edition was published in 2016.
Television Studies (with Jonathan Gray, Polity, 2011).

And editor of: 
Beyond Prime Time: Television Programming in the Post-Network Era (Routledge, 2009)

Awards and honors
International Communication Association Fellow 
Peabody Fellow Scholar 
Faculty Fellow National Association of Television Program Executives
Faculty Development Grant National Association of Television Program Executives
Coltrin Professor of the Year, International Radio and Television Society
Academy of Television Arts & Sciences Foundation Faculty Seminar
Phi Beta Kappa (DePauw University)

References

External links

American mass media scholars
DePauw University alumni
Indiana University alumni
Living people
Place of birth missing (living people)
Television studies
University of Michigan faculty
University of Texas alumni
Year of birth missing (living people)
Washington University in St. Louis fellows